The discography of Tokyo Jihen consists of five studio albums, three compilation albums, one regular release extended play and three vinyl exclusive extended plays and 13 video releases, released through Toshiba EMI, EMI Music Japan and Universal between 2004 and 2013.

Albums

Studio albums

Compilation albums

Box set

Extended plays

Singles

Promotional singles

Other appearances
The following songs are appearances by Tokyo Jihen for other musicians, as instrument performers and song arrangers.

Video releases

Music video collections

Live concerts

Music videos

Notes

References

Discographies of Japanese artists
Rock music discographies
Discography